Laguna Blanca (meaning "white lagoon" in Spanish) may refer to:

 Laguna Blanca, Chaco, a community in the Libertad Department of Argentina
 Laguna Blanca, Formosa, a community in the Pilcomayo Department of Argentina
 Laguna Blanca, Río Negro, a municipality in Río Negro Province, Argentina
 Laguna Blanca (Bolivia)
Cerro Laguna Blanca, Argentina
 Laguna Blanca (Chile), a lake in Chile
 Laguna Blanca, Chile, a commune
 Laguna Blanca (Paraguay)
 Laguna Blanca (California), U.S.

See also 
 Laguna Blanca School, California
 Laguna Blanca National Park, Argentina
 Laguna (disambiguation)